The following is a list of Major League Baseball players, retired or active.

Ha

References

External links 
Last Names starting with H – Baseball-Reference.com

 Ha